John Loy Rocker (born October 17, 1974) is a former American relief pitcher who played six seasons in Major League Baseball (MLB), primarily with the Atlanta Braves. Making his major league debut in 1998 as a member of the Braves, with whom he played four seasons, he was also a member of the Cleveland Indians, Texas Rangers, and Tampa Bay Devil Rays for one season each. He last played professionally for the Long Island Ducks of the Atlantic League of Professional Baseball in 2005.

Rocker received notoriety during his career for making controversial statements, which began with a 1999 Sports Illustrated interview and continued after his retirement. Following the conclusion of his baseball career, Rocker competed on Survivor: San Juan del Sur with girlfriend Julie McGee, placing 16th.

Baseball career
In high school, he was a pitcher for First Presbyterian Day School in Macon, Georgia. He threw  three no-hitters during his high-school career. He initially committed to play college baseball for the Georgia Bulldogs. He was drafted by the Atlanta Braves in the 18th round (516th overall) of the 1993 Major League Baseball Draft.

In 1998, he was promoted to the major league club. In Rocker's first season in the major leagues, he was 1–3 with a 2.13 ERA in 38 innings pitched. The following year, an injury put Atlanta closer Kerry Ligtenberg on the DL, moving Rocker into the role of closer, where he was 4–5 with 38 saves and a 2.49 ERA. In 2000, he was 1–2 with 24 saves, posting a 2.89 ERA, but in June 2000, Rocker was demoted for threatening a reporter.

Rocker started to receive intense taunting from opposing teams' fans due to his negative behavior, and his pitching performance began to decline. On June 23, 2001, Rocker, along with minor-league infielder Troy Cameron (Atlanta's first-round draft pick in 1997), was traded to the Cleveland Indians for right-handed relievers Steve Karsay and Steve Reed, along with cash. In Cleveland, his record that year was 3–7 with a 5.45 ERA and four saves. Rocker also played that year for the Indians in the ALDS against the Seattle Mariners.  The following year, the Indians traded him to the Texas Rangers for pitcher David Elder. In Texas, he refused designation to the minor leagues.  In 2002, he again struggled at 2–3 with a 6.66 ERA and was released. In 2003, Rocker signed with the Tampa Bay Devil Rays but was released after two appearances and an ERA of 9.00.

He took the 2004 season off to recover from surgery on his left shoulder. In 2005, he signed with the Long Island Ducks of the independent Atlantic League. In April 2005, he asked New Yorkers to "bury the hatchet." After going 0–2 with a 6.50 ERA in 23 games, he was released on June 27, 2005.

Controversies

Controversial statements
In a story published in the December 27, 1999, issue of Sports Illustrated, Rocker made a number of allegations stemming from his experiences in New York City and answering a question about whether he would ever play for the New York Yankees or the New York Mets.

  
During the interview, he also spoke of his opinion of the New York Mets and their fans:

The interview was conducted while driving to a speaking engagement in Atlanta. The reporter, Jeff Pearlman, wrote that during the interview session, Rocker spat on a Georgia State Route 400 toll machine and mocked Asian women. Also, Rocker referred to Curaçaoan teammate Randall Simon as a "fat monkey".

Although Rocker later apologized after speaking with Braves legend and Hall of Famer Hank Aaron and former Atlanta mayor and congressman Andrew Young, he continued to make controversial remarks. For his comments, Commissioner Bud Selig suspended Rocker without pay for the remainder of spring training and the first 28 games of the 2000 season,  which on appeal was reduced to 14 games (without a spring-training suspension).

In 2002, while with the Rangers, Rocker again made national headlines for his views after directing slurs towards patrons of a Dallas restaurant at which he was dining, located in the heavily LGBT-populated neighborhood of Oak Lawn.

In June 2006, Rocker defended former teammate Ozzie Guillén, at the time the manager of the Chicago White Sox, for referring to Chicago Sun-Times sports columnist Jay Mariotti as a "fag". Guillen, a native of Venezuela, claimed it was not a derogatory term and that, in Venezuela, the term only questions another man's courage rather than his sexual orientation.

"This is a free country. If he wants to use a lewd term, he should be able to use a lewd term," Rocker told the Chicago Tribune. "Can't you use a lewd term in America if you want?" Referring to sensitivity training, he was quoted as saying: "It was a farce, a way for the scared little man, Bud Selig, to get people off his ass." Rocker stated that when he attended mandatory sensitivity training he would seldom remain longer than 15 minutes. He also claimed he never paid the $500 fine that was levied against him.

In late 2006, Rocker was interviewed by the sports blog Deadspin, along with fitness model and then-girlfriend Alicia Marie. In the interview, Rocker discussed his "Speak English" campaign, as well as his upcoming book, Rocker: Scars & Strikes. Rocker stated that the book would not be used to try to repair his reputation, but would rather be "more conservative Republican rantings". Also during the interview, Rocker lambasted John Schuerholz, his former general manager with the Braves, calling him "a piece of shit".

On Survivor, during an argument with fellow castaway Natalie Anderson, Rocker told her, "If you were a man, I'd knock your teeth out."

Steroid use
In March 2007, Rocker was implicated in a steroid ring that included Applied Pharmacy of Mobile, Alabama. In December 2011, he admitted to using steroids, saying "Yeah, of course I was [using steroids]. I mean who wasn't? Let’s be honest here, who wasn't?" In December 2007, he was mentioned in the Mitchell Report.

Movie and television appearances
Rocker made his screen-acting debut in the 2002 horror comedy The Greenskeeper as a murderous golf-club groundskeeper.

In 2006, Rocker appeared on the Spike TV network's Pros vs. Joes, a program that pits retired professional athletes against amateurs.

In August 2014 it was announced that Rocker would appear on the 29th season of the competitive reality series Survivor alongside his girlfriend Julie McGee. He was the third person voted out, finishing in 16th place after he became the center of negative attention. He was immediately recognized by some of the other players who were aware of his controversial statements. He was voted out of the game with an immunity idol in his pocket on Day 8. McGee made it to the merge phase of the game, but quit in 12th place after suffering an emotional breakdown, citing the negativity surrounding Rocker earlier in the game as one of the multiple reasons that she decided to withdraw from the competition.

Though not directly based on Rocker, Danny McBride said that Kenny Powers, the main protagonist of the HBO series Eastbound and Down that the pitcher was "more or less an inspiration" for the character.

Other media activity
In December 2011, Rocker released his autobiography, Scars and Strikes.  As of 2012, he writes a column for WorldNetDaily, a conservative political site.

See also

Tampa Bay Rays all-time roster
List of Major League Baseball players named in the Mitchell Report

References

External links
, or Retrosheet, or Pelota Binaria (Venezuelan Winter League)

1974 births
American autobiographers
American columnists
Atlanta Braves players
Baseball players from Georgia (U.S. state)
Cardenales de Lara players
American expatriate baseball players in Venezuela
Cleveland Indians players
Danville Braves players
Durham Bulls players
Eugene Emeralds players
Greenville Braves players
Living people
Long Island Ducks players
Macon Braves players
Major League Baseball controversies
Major League Baseball pitchers
Oklahoma RedHawks players
Orlando Rays players
People from Statesboro, Georgia
Presbyterians from Georgia (U.S. state)
Richmond Braves players
Obscenity controversies
Sportspeople from Macon, Georgia
Survivor (American TV series) contestants
Tampa Bay Devil Rays players
Texas Rangers players
Tulsa Drillers players